Wei Jingzong (born 28 January 1995) is a Chinese footballer currently playing as a midfielder for Wuhan Jiangcheng.

Club career
Wei Jingzong would play for the Hubei youth team that studied abroad for their training, where he remained to start his professional football career when he joined third tier Portuguese football club Felgueiras 1932. He would have loan periods with Oliveira do Hospital and Shandong Luneng before permanently returning to China with second tier club Cangzhou Mighty Lions on 1 March 2018.  

On 28 February 2020, Wei would join second tier football club Zhejiang. After only one season he would loaned out to another second tier club in Sichuan Jiuniu on 31 July 2021.

Career statistics
.

References

External links
Jingzong Wei at Worldfootball.net

1995 births
Living people
Footballers from Wuhan
Footballers from Hubei
Chinese footballers
China youth international footballers
Chinese expatriate footballers
Association football midfielders
Campeonato de Portugal (league) players
China League One players
F.C. Felgueiras 1932 players
F.C. Oliveira do Hospital players
Shandong Taishan F.C. players
Cangzhou Mighty Lions F.C. players
Zhejiang Professional F.C. players
Chinese expatriate sportspeople in Portugal
Expatriate footballers in Portugal
21st-century Chinese people